Dwarf-tossing, also called midget-tossing, is a pub/bar attraction or activity in which people with dwarfism, wearing special padded clothing or Velcro costumes, are thrown onto mattresses or at Velcro-coated walls. Participants compete to throw the person with dwarfism the farthest. Dwarf Tossing was started in Australia as a form of pub entertainment in the early 1980s. A related formerly practiced activity was dwarf-bowling, in which a person with dwarfism was placed on a skateboard and used as a bowling ball.

Since its inception in the 1980s, the activity, due to its problematic name and nature has been highly controversial and remains so in the early 21st century.

Legality

Australia
Australia is commonly thought of as the place where dwarf-tossing originated as a form of pub entertainment in the early 1980s.
Laws may prohibit dwarf-tossing implicitly, but there are not explicit laws preventing a consenting dwarf from being 'tossed'.

Canada
In Ontario, Canada, the Dwarf Tossing Ban Act was introduced in 2003 by Windsor West MPP Sandra Pupatello in the Legislative Assembly of Ontario. This private member's public bill did not proceed beyond its introduction to second or third readings, nor did it receive royal assent, and therefore died at the close of the 37th Legislature. The bill proposed a fine of not more than $5,000, imprisonment of not more than six months, or both. The bill was hastily advanced in response to a dwarf-tossing contest that was held at Leopard's Lounge in Windsor, Ontario, with a dwarf nicknamed "Tripod".

France
The mayor of the small French town of Morsang-sur-Orge prohibited dwarf-tossing. The case went through the appeal chain of administrative courts to the Conseil d'État, which found that an administrative authority could legally prohibit dwarf-tossing on grounds that the activity did not respect human dignity and was thus contrary to public order. It raised legal questions as to what was admissible as a motive for an administrative authority to ban an activity for motives of public order, especially as the conseil did not want to include "public morality" in public order. The ruling was taken by the full assembly and not a smaller panel—proof of the difficulty of the question. The conseil ruled similarly in another case between an entertainment company and the city of Aix-en-Provence.

The United Nations Human Rights Committee decided on 26 July 2002, that the ban was not discriminatory with respect to dwarfs. It ruled that the ban could be considered as "necessary to protect public order, which brings into play considerations of human dignity".

Nevertheless, dwarf-tossing is not prohibited outright in France. The Conseil d'État decided that a public authority could use gross infringement on human dignity as a motive of public order to cancel a spectacle, and that dwarf-tossing constituted such a gross infringement. However, it is up to individual authorities to make specific decisions regarding prohibition.

United States
Robert and Angela Van Etten, Florida members of the Little People of America, convinced the Florida Legislature in 1989 to make dwarf-tossing illegal. A measure banning dwarf-tossing was passed by a wide margin. The New York State Legislature later followed suit.

In 2001, Dave Flood, who appeared on the MJ Morning Show as "Dave the Dwarf," filed a lawsuit seeking to overturn the 1989 law allowing the state to fine or revoke the liquor license of a bar that allows dwarf-tossing. The pastime was popular in some Florida bars in the late 1980s.

In October 2011, Ritch Workman, a Republican member of the Florida House of Representatives, introduced legislation that would overturn the ban on dwarf-tossing, claiming such a ban to be an "unnecessary burden on the freedom and liberties of people" and "an example of Big Brother government". Although not a personal advocate of the activity, Workman stated "if a little person wants to make a fool out of themselves for money, they should have the same right to do so as any average sized person".

See also
Midget professional wrestler

References

Further reading

 Analysis of dwarf tossing prohibition in Morsang-sur-Orge, Paris, France.

External links

Archived at Ghostarchive and the Wayback Machine:  Video on YouTube of midget-tossing as part of the Marto Napoli show at the Balteck, Thetford Mines, Quebec, Canada.

Individual sports
Drinking culture
Sports entertainment
Throwing sports
20th century in law
Human rights
Dwarf sports